William Albert Henry Perkins, or 'Polly' as he was affectionately known, was an Australian rules footballer who was a member of Richmond Football Club's 1943 premiership side.

Born in England, Perkins was recruited from Dandenong District Association club Noble Park and made his senior Victorian Football League (VFL) debut in 1940. Playing as a defender, Perkins also represented Victoria in interstate football and retired after the 1949 VFL season. He later coached Brighton Football Club in the Victorian Football Association (VFA).

Perkins died on 29 May 2009, aged 89.  Prior to his death, his was the last surviving player of the 1943 Premiership side.

References
 Hogan P: The Tigers of Old, Richmond FC, Melbourne 1996

1920 births
2009 deaths
Australian rules footballers from Victoria (Australia)
Richmond Football Club players
Richmond Football Club Premiership players
Brighton Football Club players
Brighton Football Club coaches
VFL/AFL players born in England
One-time VFL/AFL Premiership players
English emigrants to Australia
Sportspeople from Leicester